Virginia Karentzou (born 25 June 1978) is a Greek gymnast. She competed at the 1996 Summer Olympics.

References

External links
 

1978 births
Living people
Greek female artistic gymnasts
Olympic gymnasts of Greece
Gymnasts at the 1996 Summer Olympics
Gymnasts from Thessaloniki